
Gmina Osiek is a rural gmina (administrative district) in Brodnica County, Kuyavian-Pomeranian Voivodeship, in north-central Poland.

Villages
Gmina Osiek contains the villages and settlements of Dębowo, Jeziorki, Kretki Duże, Kretki Małe, Kujawa, Łapinóż, Obórki, Osiek, Osiek-Kolonia, Strzygi, Sumin, Sumówko, Szynkowizna, Tadajewo, Tomaszewo, Warpalice and Wrzeszewo.

Neighbouring gminas
Gmina Osiek is bordered by the gminas of Nowe, Rypin, Świedziebnia and Wąpielsk.

References

Polish official population figures 2006

Osiek
Gmina Osiek